Boljunčica is a river in inland Istria, Croatia. It discharges into the Adriatic Sea near Plomin. Its average discharge at the measurement station in Polje Čepić (covering 183 km2 of the basin) is 0.956 m3/s, and it can go completely dry.

Boljunčica rises on the western slopes of the Učka mountain and flows to the south. Near Polje Čepić and Potpićan, it goes underground and emerges near Plomin.

References

Rivers of Croatia
Landforms of Istria County
Drainage basins of the Adriatic Sea